Ipomoea purga is a species of flowering plant in the genus Ipomoea. It is commonly referred to as jalap and is probably also the source of the John the Conqueror root.

Description
When fresh, the root is black externally, white and milky within, and varies in size according to its age. It has heart shaped leaves and purple trumpet like flowers. Ipomoea purga is rather difficult to break down, but if triturated with cream of tartar, sugar of milk, or other hard salts, the process of pulverization is much easier, and the powder rendered much finer. When in powder form in order to ingest, the color is a pale grayish brown. Ipomoea purga is native to Mexico and it is naturalized in other parts of the neotropics.

Discovery
Ipomoea purga was encountered by Spanish conquistadores during the conquest of Mexico. It was introduced to Europe in 1565 as a medical herb used to treat an array of illnesses up until the 19th century when modern medical practices became the norm.

Medical uses
The root contains convolvulin, which is a powerful cathartic (see jalap). It is used to prevent diarrhea, but large amounts will induce vomiting. When applied to a wound, it is said to induce purgation.

Chemical composition
Ipomoea purga resin can be dissolved in either alcohol or diethyl ether. The resin that is insoluble in ether is odorless while the resin soluble in alcohol does have an odor and is typically a brownish color. The convolvulinolic acid (C28H52O14)that is produced in Ipomoea purga can be broken down into a sugar molecule (C6H12O6) and a form of crystallized convolvulinolic acid (C16H30O3) when diluted.

Synonyms
Basionym
Convolvulus purga Wender., Pharmac. Centralb. 1:457. 1830.

Homotypic
Exogonium purga (Wender.) Benth., Pl. Hartw. 46. 1840.

Heterotypic
Convolvulus officinalis Pelletan, J. Chim. Méd. t. 1. 1834.
Ipomoea jalapa Nutt. & Cox, Journ. Am. Med. Sci. 5: 305. 1830, nom illeg. non Pursh (1813).
Ipomoea jalapa Schiede & Deppe ex G. Don, Gen. Hist. 4: 271. 1838.
Ipomoea schiedeana Zucc., Flora vol. 14, 802. 1831.

References

purga
Flora of Mexico